Dancing Backward in High Heels is the fifth and final studio album by the New York Dolls, and the third since their 2004 reunion. Released on March 15, 2011, on 429 Records, it contains covers of the 1946 Leon René standard "I Sold My Heart to the Junkman," and "Funky But Chic," originally from David Johansen's 1978 self titled album.

The title is a reference to actress Ginger Rogers. In a 1982 Frank and Ernest cartoon by Bob Thaves,(image) a woman is telling Frank and Ernest "Sure (Fred Astaire) was great, but don't forget that Ginger Rogers did everything he did, ...backwards and in high heels."

Personnel
Dancing Backward in High Heels was produced by Jason Hill, who also replaced Sami Yaffa as Dolls bassist on this album. Also joining Johansen and Sylvain Sylvain, the only original members of the New York Dolls still living, are drummer Brian Delaney, who has been with the Dolls since their 2004 reunion, and former Blondie guitarist Frank Infante.

New York Dolls
David Johansen – lead vocals, harmonica
Sylvain Sylvain – guitar, vocals
Frank Infante – guitar
Jason Hill - bass, vocals
Brian Delaney - drums

Track listing

References

2011 albums
New York Dolls albums
429 Records albums